Astro Farm is a British children's television series animated in stop motion. It featured the adventures of the Foxwoods, a small family who work on an asteroid, which is covered in farmland. Astro Farm was produced by FilmFair for Central Independent Television, and was first broadcast on CITV in 1992.

Synopsis
The main action takes place on an asteroid dedicated to farming. The Foxwoods live in a small cottage with a barn nearby. Daisy, the cow lives in a separate farm. The atmosphere is artificial and is controlled by the weather machine in the cottage. The Gorps live on a nearby asteroid known as 'Gorpdale' which is dark and wet.

The principal characters are Sam; Sam's wife Lizzie; their son, Tom; Dinko, a dog; Daisy, the cow and blue chickens called Clucks; featuring the Gorps, Splodger and Biff, two miscreants who steal food and cause trouble at the farm.

Episodes

Series 1 1992
 Wacky Weather (11 September 1992)
 Flying Dinko (18 September 1992)
 The Well (25 September 1992)
 Moo Flu (2 October 1992)
 Astro Dragon (9 October 1992)
 Butterfly (16 October 1992)
 Disappearing Bubbles (23 October 1992)
 The Big Sneeze (30 October 1992)
 The Tomato Competition (6 November 1992)
 Barn Dance (13 November 1992)
 The Black Hole Mole (20 November 1992)
 Training Dinko (27 November 1992)
 The Surprise (4 December 1992)

Series 2 1993
 Biff Builds A Rocket (15 October 1993)
 Cluck Soup (22 October 1993)
 Holiday (29 October 1993)
 King Splodger (5 November 1993)
 Lizzie's Quiet Day (12 November 1993)
 Pumpkin (19 November 1993)
 Seeing Double (26 November 1993)
 Shrinking Machine (26 November 1993)
 Solar Wind (3 December 1993)
 Wild martian Tiger (10 December 1993)
 Wishing Well (17 December 1993)

Series 3 1994
 All Aboard! (13 October 1994)
 Astrodale Farm (20 October 1994)
 Bathtime (27 October 1994)
 Biff's Baby (3 November 1994)
 Crow Twins (10 November 1994)
 Dial G For Gorpdale (17 November 1994)
 Magic Onions (24 November 1994)
 Spooked! (1 December 1994)
 Super Tom (8 December 1994)

Series 4 1995
 1, 2, 3, Pull! (28 September 1995)
 A Mole in One (5 October 1995)
 Biff, Do Your Best! (12 October 1995)
 Cowboy Tom (19 October 1995)
 Dragon Moon (26 October 1995)
 Futile Attraction (2 November 1995)
 Pied Piper of Gorpdale (9 November 1995)
 Slimcurd, Slimcurd, Everywhere! (16 November 1995)
 Splodger, The Spider (23 November 1995)
 That Takes the Biscuit! (30 November 1995)

Series 5 1996
 Lucky Dip (2 October 1996)
 Mousequake (9 October 1996)
 Pigs Might Fly (16 October 1996)
 Poultry in Motion (23 October 1996)
 Spaced-Out Splodger (30 October 1996)
 Sparks Fly! (6 November 1996)
 Splodger's About! (13 November 1996)
 Surprise!, Surprise! (20 November 1996)
 To Catch a Thief (27 November 1996)
 Tom and the Beanstalk (4 December 1996)

Re-airings
The series was repeated on CITV until 1996. It was then aired on Nickelodeon in 1997. Nickelodeon only aired the first series, as that was the only one remastered by CINAR when they purchased FilmFair London in 1996 and remastered the studio's shows.

Home media
In the United Kingdom, in 1992 by Pickwick Video originally released two VHS tapes of the series, containing Series 1 episodes. Those were reissued in 1995 by Carlton Home Entertainment.

UK VHS releases
 Pickwick (1992) 
Carlton Home Entertainment (1995)

External links
Astro Farm at Toonhound.
.

1990s British animated television series
1990s British children's television series
1992 British television series debuts
1996 British television series endings
British children's animated science fantasy television series
Clay animation television series
English-language television shows
ITV children's television shows
Nick Jr. original programming
Fictional farms
Television series by Cookie Jar Entertainment
Television series by FilmFair
Television series by DHX Media
Television series by ITV Studios
Television shows produced by Central Independent Television